is a Japanese mangaka known for the shōnen series Reborn!.

Early versions of Reborn! were published in seinen manga magazines. In late 2003, the series, a stand-alone short story at the time, was published in the Weekly Shōnen Jump magazine. After the success of the short story, the series began serialization in the magazine in mid-2004. Since then, the manga has been adapted into an anime, as well as five light novels and several video games. On Nikkei Entertainment's list of most successful manga artists she ranked 12th.

Works
 Shōnen Spin
 Neppuu Yakyuu Densetsu Picchan
  (2000, serialized in Bessatsu Young Magazine and Young Magazine)
 Monkey Business  (2002)
 Bakuhatsu HAWK!!  (one-shot released in 2003)
 Reborn! (2004–2012, serialized in Weekly Shōnen Jump)
 Psycho-Pass (original character design)
 Warashibe Tantei Numashichirō (one-shot released in 2013)
 ēlDLIVE (2013–2018, serialized in Jump Live, later transferred to Shonen Jump+)
 Sleepy Netarou Appears (one-shot released in 2014)
 Hot (one-shot released in 2018)
 Ron Kamonohashi: Deranged Detective (2020–present, serialized in Shonen Jump+)

References

External links
New Amano In Kyoto Exhibit
Check Out The Summary Of The New "Psycho-Pass" Character Designer Interview
Akira Amano Exhibit Show
Akira Amano Exhibition
Akira Amano comic list
Top manga list

Women manga artists
Living people
1973 births
Japanese female comics artists
Female comics writers
Manga artists from Aichi Prefecture
21st-century Japanese women writers
21st-century Japanese writers